Williamson Glacier Tongue is the prominent seaward extension of the Williamson Glacier into Colvocoresses Bay. Delineated from air photos taken by U.S. Navy Operation Highjump (1946–47). Named by Advisory Committee on Antarctic Names (US-ACAN) in association with Williamson Glacier.

Ice tongues of Antarctica
Bodies of ice of Wilkes Land